Pomegranate production in Afghanistan is a significant contributor to the country's agricultural economy. It likely existed in the country since ancient time. Pomegranates are a major fruit crop in many provinces, particularly in Kandahar, Helmand, Wardak, Ghazni, Paktia, Farah, Kapisa and Balkh, and are the source of the livelihoods of thousands of people.

Afghanistan is known as "the country of the pomegranate fruit" in view of not only its conventional methods of cultivation but also for the quality of the landraces grown.

History

Some leading botanists believe that Afghanistan is the cradle of world pomegranate production. Afghanistan has more varieties of pomegranate trees than anywhere else in the world.

Since the 1970s, political turmoil and wars have ravaged the country; this has had a serious effect on exporting the fruit to its biggest markets in Pakistan and India.

Since the end of the war, there has been a re-emergence in the pomegranate industry in Afghanistan. In 2009, hundreds of thousand of pomegranate trees were planted and the nation exported some 50,000 tons of the fruit. In October 2009 a £6 million juice factory was constructed in Kabul to make juice concentrate from the fruit as it becomes more commercially viable; increasing demand on the world market has seen local market prices rise from 34p a kilogram to £1 a kilogram since 2009.

In 2010 the new Afghanistan–Pakistan Transit Trade Agreement (APTTA) was signed between Afghanistan and Pakistan, which permits Afghan traders to export local agricultural produce by road to Indian the markets via the Wagah border post.

International demand
Some people have speculated that an increase in Afghan fruit production towards a more international market would be the best way to combat opium production in the country. Gradually the international market for Afghan pomegranates is increasing with demand from overseas. In 2010, Afghanistan began exporting the fruit to Carrefour in Dubai. This has created significant competition there among their Turkish and North African counterparts as the Afghan product is said to be larger, redder and juicier. Carrefour has also placed a demand for Afghan pomegranates in other stores in countries in the Middle East.

It was reported in 2010 that Pomegreat has entered into a £3 million deal with Omaid Bahar, a Kabul-based company, to buy pomegranate juice from Afghanistan. This is said to benefit around 50,000 Afghan farmers.

However, international demand for Afghan pomegranates is still in its infancy; the majority of the U.S. domestic supply for instance comes from the San Joaquin Valley, Israel, Turkey, Lebanon, Greece and Mexico.

Product
Pomegranates contain high levels of antioxidants, and protect cells from damage by compounds called free radicals. They are also reported to protect against certain types of cancer and lower blood pressure. Afghan pomegranates in comparison to the same fruit from other places are said to be larger (jumbo), sweeter and redder.
They are increasingly becoming consumed in Europe and North Africa as a health food and for its juicy, sweet taste. USAID has also described pomegranates grown in the northern Khulm River basin in the north of the country to be "the finest in Afghanistan". Adam Pritchard, the Chief Executive of Pomegreat has described the Afghan pomegranate as "the best in the world" and Afghanistan as their "spiritual home". Its ranking among fruits grown in the country is reported to be second, the first being grapes.

Production

The main production area of pomegranates is in the Kandahar Province, where 806 ha of land are under pomegranate cultivation. Its production per ha of land was also very high in the Dand and Arghandab districts of the province with yield of 344 kg/ha and 760 kg/ha respectively. The variety of pomegranate grown in Kandahar is known as the jumbo, ruby-red "Kandahari" variety, while the seedless variety is known as Badana, which is good for eating or converting into juices.

Annual fair
Because of its popularity and demand for exports, the World Pomegranate Fair is an annual event in Afghanistan. Such an event, which is the meeting place for producers, buyers, packaging, logistics, and cold storage technology companies, equipment vendors, international experts on pomegranate production and processing and government agencies, is the road show that will bring to fore "the Afghan pomegranate industry, create new business opportunities, and benefit the people of Afghanistan." The harvesting period usually start from end of September through November.

See also 
 Economy of Afghanistan

References

External links

 , Oct. 25, 2018, Voice of America.
 , Dec. 3, 2017, BBC Pashto.
 , Oct. 24, 2017, Voice of America.

Pomegranate products
Agriculture in Afghanistan